Kamlak are a Rajput tribe found mainly in the Rajauri District and Poonch district in the Jammu Division of Jammu and Kashmir, India.

The clan claim that they are the descendants of Raja Azamat Khan kamlak, who migrated from Budhal to the village of Azamatabad, situated in north Thanamandi Tehsil in budhal and surankote the village of potha in surankote tehsil , there are several villages of Kamlak, both Hindu and Muslim. The Hindu Kamlak are a Dogra clan, and they intermarry with neighbouring clans such as the Charak, Chandial and Kanaria, and Manhas. Both groups of Kamlak claim a common origin and have some common customs and rituals.

See also 
Domaal Rajputs

References 

Dogra
Rajput clans
Social groups of Jammu and Kashmir